The Dyer River is a  river in Maine.  It originates along the northern boundary of the town of Jefferson with the town of Somerville and flows southwesterly through Jefferson, passing through Dyer Long Pond and near South Jefferson. It continues southwest into the town of Newcastle, passing the villages of North Newcastle and Sheepscot, where it joins the tidal Sheepscot River.

See also
List of rivers of Maine

References

Maine Streamflow Data from the USGS
Maine Watershed Data From Environmental Protection Agency

Rivers of Lincoln County, Maine
Rivers of Maine